Iosif (Joseph) Davydovich Kobzon (11 September 1937 – 30 August 2018) was a Russian singer, known for his crooner style.

Early life
Kobzon was born to Jewish parents in the mining town of Chasiv Yar, in the Donbas region of Ukraine.

As a boy he demonstrated a talent for singing, winning numerous regional singing contests. He reached the national finals on two separate occasions, appearing in concerts dedicated to Joseph Stalin – a significant honour at the time.

Despite his talent for singing, Kobzon went on to technical school to study geology and mining in Dnipropetrovsk, as this was considered a lucrative vocation in the Soviet Union following the Second World War. However, in 1959, following his 1956–1959 contact with professional music instructors in the Soviet Army where he was a member of the armies song and dance ensemble, he decided that music would be his preferred vocation.

Stage career
In 1958, Kobzon officially started his singing career in Moscow, and enrolled to study at the Gnessin Institute. In the next few years he made valuable contacts in Moscow's entertainment world, and was eventually given a chance by composer Arkady Ostrovsky to perform some of his music. Initially, he performed in a duet with the tenor Viktor Kokhno, but was eventually offered a solo repertoire by many of the outstanding composers of the time such as Mark Fradkin,  and Yan Frenkel.

In 1962, he recorded his first LP which included songs written by Aleksandra Pakhmutova.

In 1964, he triumphed at the International Song Contest in Sopot, Poland, and in the following year he took part in the "Friendship" contest held across six nations, winning first prize in Warsaw, Berlin and Budapest.

His popularity rose quickly, and demand for his singing saw him frequently performing two to three concerts a day. His most popular hit song at the time was titled "A u nas vo dvore".

During Leonid Brezhnev's time in office (1964–82), there was hardly an official concert where Kobzon did not take part, and in 1980 he was awarded the honour of People's Artist of the USSR.

His best-known song is "Instants" from the legendary Soviet TV series Seventeen Moments of Spring (1973). Kobzon sang many songs for the Seventeen  Moments of Spring, but, because of his Jewish nationality, he was not listed on the credits.

In 1983, Kobzon was expelled from the Communist Party of the Soviet Union and reprimanded for "political short sightedness," after he performed Jewish songs during an international friendship concert, which resulted in the Arab delegations leaving in protest. However, the following year, (1984) his reputation was restored, as he was honored with the USSR State Prize.

Joseph Kobzon has performed in solo concerts in most cities of the former USSR. He was also bestowed the rare honour of performing international concerts tours as a representative of USSR in United States, Panama, Peru, Ecuador, Bolivia, Uruguay, Costa Rica, Argentina, Israel, Republic of the Congo, Zaire, Angola, Nigeria, Portugal, Spain, Sweden, (Germany), Greece, and Finland. Throughout his career, he has shared the stage with many Western superstars, including the likes of Liza Minnelli and Julio Iglesias.

Since May 1995, Kobzon and his entire family was banned from entering the United States due to his allegedly close associations with drug trafficking, illicit arms trading, and Russian mafia in Moscow especially Viktor Nikiforov (Kalina), Otari Kvantrishvili (Otarik, Krivonos), Alexander Zakharov (Zakhar), Alimzhan Tokhtakhunov (Taiwanchik) and Vyacheslav Ivankov (Yaponchik).

Although he officially ended his international touring career in 1997, he continued to appear in regular concerts before audiences around the world and was frequently seen on Russian television.

Public life

On many occasions, Kobzon performed in disaster areas and military hot-spots such as Afghanistan during the Soviet-Afghan War, and Chechnya during the Chechen War.

In 1986, Kobzon was the first celebrity to visit and perform in the town of Chernobyl to cheer the nuclear reactor rescuers. Two years later, Kobzon was the first celebrity to visit and perform for victims of the 1988 Armenian earthquake.

Kobzon has been active in Russian politics since 1989. He was an experienced Russian MP and enjoyed landslide election victories.

His first major political achievement (1989–1991) transpired when his promotion of Jewish culture in the USSR aided the establishment of diplomatic ties between USSR and Israel.

For many years, Kobzon has presided over numerous charitable organisations. Since 1989, he has been Chairman of The Movement for Honour and Dignity of Russian Citizens. He is also the president of the Humanitarian Initiatives Fund, and the president of a charitable fund known as ‘Shield and Lira" which is devoted to helping families of those killed and injured in action while on law enforcement duties.

He was Chairman of the Public Council of Moscow's Police Department, and leader of his political party "The Russian Party for Peace".

Since the early 1990s, Kobzon has personally funded numerous orphanages around the country.

In 2002, he risked his life as key negotiator in the Moscow theater hostage crisis. His involvement resulted in the release of a mother with three children and a British citizen.

Kobzon's innumerable contributions to culture, music, humanitarian and political life across the Commonwealth of Independent States saw a monument depicting Kobzon erected near his birthplace, in Donetsk, Ukraine in 2003.

Between 2005 and 2007, he was the head of the State Duma's culture committee.

In 2007, his name was entered into the Guinness Book of Records (Russian Edition) as the most decorated artist in the country's history.

In 2009, Kobzon became the 24th individual to be named Honorary Citizen of Moscow.

He has suffered from prostate cancer since 2005. He died on 30 August 2018.

"Russia's Frank Sinatra"
Considering Kobzon's career, personality, spirit and singing style, many say that he was Russia's answer to the U.S. crooner Frank Sinatra. Besides their singing careers, both Sinatra and Kobzon used their popularity towards an active involvement in politics. The parallels between the two became the focus of media articles, books and novels claiming to have detailed knowledge of Russia's gangster world based on inside information obtained from the CIA. As a result, Kobzon was barred entry to the United States from 1995 when his visa was revoked on allegations of mafia ties. In response, Kobzon successfully sued numerous publications for propagating unsubstantiated rumours, asserting his impeccable reputation and great honour among millions of Russian-speakers worldwide.

Stance on Ukraine
In March 2014, Kobzon was among 500 Russian artists who signed an open letter in support of Russia's annexation of Crimea. As a result, in July 2014, Kobzon was included in a selected group of Russian artists banned from entering Latvia.

Following the Revolution of Dignity, pro-Russian unrest broke out in Ukraine. In late October 2014, Kobzon visited Donbas on a humanitarian mission, providing medications to hospitals in the Donetsk and Luhansk regions and giving a free concert in support of the people of the self-proclaimed Donetsk People's Republic. As a result of the visit, Alexander Zakharchenko (then Prime Minister of the Donetsk People's Republic) bestowed on Kobzon the title of Russia's "honorary consul" to DPR. However, the title had questionable meaning as there are no reports of Russia formally sending Kobzon as an honorary consul to DPR nor ratifying this appointment.

On 3 September 2014 deputies of the Dnipropetrovsk City Council deprived Kobzon of the title of "Honorary citizen of Dnipropetrovsk", on 25 November 2014 Poltava City Council removed his title of "Honorary citizen of Poltava", and on 28 January 2015 Kramatorsk City Council removed his title of "Honorary citizen of Kramatorsk." In autumn 2014, Ukraine's national security service banned him from entering the country. Kobzon responded by saying that "he shouldn't need a visa to visit his own homeland and birthplace." He stated that he welcomed any decision by Ukraine's authorities to strip him of honours, as he didn't want to be "an honorary citizen of a country that is run by a fascist regime." He requested that Ukraine also strip him of his People's Artist of Ukraine award. In February 2015, Kobzon was awarded Honorary Citizenship of Yenakiieve in Donetsk Oblast (controlled by the Donetsk People's Republic), and was later awarded the honour of 'People's Artist' by self-proclaimed Luhansk People's Republic.

In February 2015, the European Union added Kobzon to its list of individuals sanctioned with asset freezes and travel bans because he had "visited the so-called Donetsk People's Republic and during his visit made statements supporting separatists"; Kobzon responded that he was "very pleased and grateful." Canada also applied economic sanctions and a travel ban. He was "proud to be included in a list of people who are not indifferent to the fate of internally displaced Russian-speakers in Donbas and the fate of Russia". Russian MPs spoke out in response to the EU sanctions, while Kobzon's fans launched a Twitter campaign in his support. Russia's Foreign Ministry said that the new sanctions defy common sense, referring to the fact that Kobzon was on a humanitarian mission to help innocent people caught in a war zone and that the sanctions were imposed just one day after the Minsk II agreement came into force. The agreement was reached between EU representatives (Germany and France), Ukraine and Russia, and was aimed at resolving the War in Donbas. Communist Party leader Gennady Zyuganov condemned Kobzon's inclusion on the sanctions list as "vile" and "cynical", questioning the purpose of sanctioning "a highly respected national artist" whose mission in Donbas was "fundamentally humanitarian." A ruling party MP, Vyacheslav Nikonov, spoke in parliament to support Kobzon, stating "We are with you. If they're all Charlie, then we are all Kobzon", playing on the "Je Suis Charlie" slogan used in the wake of the Charlie Hebdo shooting. In response to calls for retaliatory sanctions, Russia's culture minister Vladimir Medinsky said that Moscow could not impose equal sanctions on the EU, because "Europe simply lacks a star of the same standing as Kobzon." Kobzon returned to Donbas one week following the EU's decision. This was his second humanitarian mission to the region delivering medications to hospitals in Luhansk, and giving another free concert "to support local residents".

"Going to a Kobzon concert"
The "Kobzon Concert" meme arose after the murder of Alexander Zakharchenko, the leader of the self-proclaimed DPR, which took place on August 31, 2018. At that time, jokes were spread in Ukrainian social networks that Zakharchenko went to the "Kobzon concert", who died the day before - on August 30.

After the 24 February 2022 Russian invasion of Ukraine, the phrase in Ukrainian sent to a Kobzon concert grew in popularity to denote that a pro Russia combatant who was "going to a Kobzon concert" had met a quick death.

Personal life
Kobzon has been married three times. In 1965, he married the singer, ; then in 1969 Kobzon married Lyudmila Gurchenko, one of the best known comic actresses of the Soviet cinema. In 1971, he married Ninel Drizina with whom he had two children. As of October 2012, his daughter, who is banned from entering the United States, holds an Australian passport and lives in England with her husband and three children and his son, who is banned from entering the United States, has three children.

Honours and awards

Orders
 Order For Merit to the Fatherland 1st class (26 June 2012) – for outstanding contribution to culture and music;
 Order For Merit to the Fatherland 2nd class (21 September 2002) – for outstanding contribution to culture and music;
 Order for Merit for the Fatherland 3rd class (11 September 1997) – for his great personal contribution to the development of musical art;
 Order of Courage (30 December 2002) – for courage and dedication shown during the rescue of people in a situation involving a risk to life during an act of terrorism at the Moscow theater hostage crisis in October 2002;
 Order of Friendship of Peoples;
 Order of Glory (Azerbaijan) (2007) – for services to strengthen cultural ties between the Russian Federation and the Republic of Azerbaijan;
 Officer of the Order of Merit of the Republic of Hungary (2007);
 Ukrainian Order of Merit 1st class (3 July 2012) – for personal contribution to the socio-economic and cultural development of the area, professionalism, and to mark the 80th anniversary of Donetsk region (revoked by the President of Ukraine 14 May 2018);
 Ukrainian Order of Merit 2nd class (3 July 2002) – for personal contribution to the socio-economic and cultural development of the area, professionalism, and to mark the 70th anniversary of Donetsk region (revoked by the President of Ukraine 14 May 2018);
 Ukrainian Order of Merit 3rd class (18 February 2000) – a significant personal contribution to the development of art song, many years of fruitful creative and social activities (revoked by the President of Ukraine 14 May 2018);
 Dostyk order, 2nd class (Kazakhstan, 2008)
 Order of Holy Prince Daniel of Moscow, 2nd class (Russian Orthodox Church, 1998)
 Order of St. Sergius, 2nd class (Russian Orthodox Church, 2002)
 Order "For Merit" (Ingushetia, 2008)

Titles
 Hero of Labour of the Russian Federation (21 April 2016) 
 People's Artist of the USSR (1987)
 People's Artist of the RSFSR (1980)
 People's Artist of Ukraine (1991, revoked by the President of Ukraine 14 May 2018)
 Honoured Artist of the RSFSR (1973)
 People's Artist of Dagestan ASSR (1974)
 Honoured Artist of the Checheno-Ingush Autonomous Soviet Socialist Republic (1964)
 Honoured Artist of Adygea (1992)
 Honoured Artist of the Karachay-Cherkessia (2008)
 People's Artist of North Ossetia–Alania (2008)
 Honorary Member of the Russian Academy of Arts
 Honoured Worker of the Federal Bailiff Service

Medals

Awards
 USSR State Prize (1984) – for concert programs 1980–1983
 Lenin Komsomol Prize (1976) – for concert programs 1974–1975, active propaganda Soviet Komsomol songs
 Russian Federal Security Service Award "for creative contribution to the patriotic education of Russian citizens" (2009)

|-
! colspan="3" style="background: red;" | Ovation
|-

|-

Kobzon was awarded honorary citizenship of 28 cities: Anapa, Saratov (1998), Donetsk (2007), Bishkek, Dnipro (deprived of the honor on 3 September 2014), Kramatorsk, Noginsk, Poltava (deprived of the honor on 25 November 2014), Slavic (1999), Chasiv Yar, Cherkessk, Artemovsk, Horlivka and others. He is also an honorary citizen of the Saratov Oblast, Ust-Orda Buryat Autonomous Okrug (abolished 1 January 2008) and the Transbaikal Oblast (23 September 2010).

On 31 March 2009, Kobzon was awarded the title of Honorary Citizen of Moscow – "for his services and contribution to the organization and development of national culture, long-term activities designed to meet the challenges of the patriotic and cultural education of the Russian people, as well as charitable activity in the city of Moscow and other Russian regions".

Other honours
 Monument in Donetsk by Alexander Rukavishnikov (30 August 2003)
 Diploma of the Government of the Kabardino-Balkar Republic (2008)

A comprehensive list of all 300+ honours awarded to Joseph Kobzon can be viewed at http://iosifkobzon.ru/activity/rank/ (in Russian).

References

External links

 
 Official site of Iosif Kobzon
  
 Joseph Kobzon at iTunes
 

1937 births
2018 deaths
People from Chasiv Yar
Ukrainian Jews
Jewish singers
Soviet male singers
Russian pop singers
Baritones
Deaths from cancer in Russia
Deaths from prostate cancer
Moscow theater hostage crisis
Recipients of the Order "For Merit to the Fatherland", 1st class
Recipients of the Order "For Merit to the Fatherland", 2nd class
Recipients of the Order "For Merit to the Fatherland", 3rd class
Chevaliers of the Order of Merit (Ukraine)
People's Artists of the USSR
Honorary Members of the Russian Academy of Arts
Officer's Crosses of the Order of Merit of the Republic of Hungary (civil)
Recipients of the Order of Courage
Recipients of the Order of Friendship of Peoples
Recipients of the Order of Holy Prince Daniel of Moscow
People's Artists of the RSFSR
Recipients of the title of People's Artists of Ukraine
Honored Artists of the RSFSR
Recipients of the USSR State Prize
Recipients of the Lenin Komsomol Prize
Gnessin State Musical College alumni
Russian people of Ukrainian-Jewish descent
21st-century Russian politicians
20th-century Russian male singers
20th-century Russian singers
Russian National Music Award winners
Second convocation members of the State Duma (Russian Federation)
Third convocation members of the State Duma (Russian Federation)
Fourth convocation members of the State Duma (Russian Federation)
Fifth convocation members of the State Duma (Russian Federation)
Sixth convocation members of the State Duma (Russian Federation)
Seventh convocation members of the State Duma (Russian Federation)
Winners of the Golden Gramophone Award
Russian individuals subject to European Union sanctions